Parrots, also known as psittacines, are the 402 species of birds that make up the order Psittaciformes, found in most tropical and subtropical regions, of which 387 are extant. The order is subdivided into three superfamilies: the Psittacoidea ("true" parrots), the Cacatuoidea (cockatoos), and the Strigopoidea (New Zealand parrots). Parrots have a generally pantropical distribution with several species inhabiting temperate regions in the Southern Hemisphere as well. The greatest diversity of parrots is in South America and Australasia.

The Cacatuoidea are quite distinct, having a movable head crest, a different arrangement of the carotid arteries, a gall bladder, differences in the skull bones, and lack the Dyck texture feathers that—in the Psittacoidea—scatter light to produce the vibrant colours of so many parrots. Lorikeets were previously regarded as a family, Loriidae,  but are now considered a tribe (Loriini) within the subfamily Loriinae, family Psittaculidae. Some species, such as the Puerto Rican amazon (Amazona vittata) have had a population bottleneck  (in this case reduced to 13 individuals in 1975) and subsequently have low genetic variability and low reproductive success, leading to complications with conservation.

No consensus existed regarding the taxonomy of Psittaciformes until recently. The placement of the Strigopoidea species has been variable in the past. They were once considered part of the Psittacoidea, but recent 21st-century studies place this group of New Zealand species as their own superfamily next to the Cacatuoidea and remaining members of the Psittacoidea. Many studies have confirmed the unique placement of this group at the base of the parrot tree. Most authors now recognize this group as a separate taxon containing two families: Nestoridae and Strigopidae. Conversely, the relationships among various cockatoo genera are largely resolved.

Conventions

Conservation status codes listed follow the International Union for Conservation of Nature (IUCN) Red List of Threatened Species. Range maps are provided wherever possible; if a range map is not available, a description of the bird's range is provided. Ranges are based on the IUCN red list for that species unless otherwise noted. All extinct species listed went extinct after 1500 CE (recently extinct), and are indicated by a dagger symbol "†".

Classification

The order Psittaciformes consists of 387 extant species belonging to 87 genera. The following classification is based on the most recent proposals as of 2012.

Superfamily Psittacoidea: true parrots
 Family Psittacidae
 Subfamily Psittacinae: two African genera, Psittacus and Poicephalus
 Subfamily Arinae
 Tribe Arini: eighteen genera
 Tribe Androglossini: seven genera
 Family Psittaculidae
 Subfamily Psittrichasinae: one species, Pesquet's parrot
 Subfamily Coracopsinae: one genus with several species
 Subfamily Platycercinae
 Tribe Pezoporini: ground parrots and allies
 Tribe Platycercini: broad-tailed parrots
 Subfamily Psittacellinae: one genus (Psittacella) with several species
 Subfamily Loriinae
 Tribe Loriini: lories and lorikeets
 Tribe Melopsittacini: one genus with one species, the budgerigar
 Tribe Cyclopsittini: fig parrots
 Subfamily Agapornithinae: three genera
 Subfamily Psittaculinae
 Tribe Polytelini: three genera
 Tribe Psittaculini: Asian psittacines
 Tribe Micropsittini: pygmy parrots
Superfamily Cacatuoidea: cockatoos
 Family Cacatuidae
 Subfamily Nymphicinae: one genus with one species, the cockatiel
 Subfamily Calyptorhynchinae: the black cockatoos
 Subfamily Cacatuinae
 Tribe Microglossini: one genus with one species, the black palm cockatoo
 Tribe Cacatuini: four genera of white, pink, and grey species
Superfamily Strigopoidea: New Zealand parrots
 Family Nestoridae: two genera with two living (kea and New Zealand kaka) and several extinct species of the New Zealand region
 Family Strigopidae: the flightless, critically endangered kakapo of New Zealand

True parrots

Family Psittacidae

Subfamily Psittacinae

Subfamily Arinae (neotropical parrots)

Tribe Arini

Tribe Forpini

Tribe Amoropsittacini

Tribe Androglossini

Family Psittaculidae

Subfamily Platycercinae

Tribe Platycercini (broad-tailed parrots)

Tribe Pezoporini Bonaparte, 1837

Subfamily Psittacellinae

Subfamily Loriinae

Tribe Loriini Selby, 1836

Tribe Melopsittacini

Tribe Cyclopsittini (fig parrots)

Subfamily Agapornithinae

Subfamily Psittaculinae

Tribe Polytelini

Tribe Psittaculini

Tribe Micropsittini

Family Psittrichasiidae

Subfamily Coracopsinae

Subfamily Psittrichasinae

Cockatoos

Family Cacatuidae

Subfamily Nymphicinae

Subfamily Calyptorhynchinae

Subfamily Cacatuinae

Tribe Microglossini

Tribe Cacatuini

New Zealand parrots

Family Nestoridae

Family Strigopidae

See also

List of true parrots
List of macaws
List of amazon parrots
List of Nestoridae
List of Aratinga parakeets

Notes

References

External links
eBird – Enter the name of a parrot species to find detailed information about their current range as well as sightings across the world
IOC World Bird List – A comprehensive list of parrots with up-to-date information on taxonomy, including synonyms and authority
Integrated Taxonomic Information System – A list providing taxonomic information on all subordinate taxa of Psittaciformes, including subspecies

Parrots